Carrasco is a province in the Cochabamba Department in central Bolivia. Its capital is Totora.

Geography 
Some of the highest mountains of the province are listed below:

Subdivision 
Carrasco Province is divided into six municipalities which are further subdivided into cantons.

Entre Ríos Municipality was created in 2004.

The people 
The people are predominantly indigenous citizens of Quechuan descent. There are also groups of Yuracaré along Chapare River in the municipalities Chimoré and Puerto Villarroel.

Languages 
The languages spoken in the Carrasco Province are mainly Quechua and Spanish. The following table shows the number of those belonging to the recognized group of speakers.

Visitor attractions 
Carrasco National Park and the archaeological site of Inkallaqta are situated within the province.

References 

Provinces of Cochabamba Department